Three referendums were held in Switzerland during 1898. The first was held on 20 February on a federal law that would nationalise the railways, and was approved by a majority of voters, leading to the establishment of Swiss Federal Railways in 1902. The second and third referendums were held on 13 November on revising article 64 and adding article 64bis to the constitution, both of which were approved by a majority of voters and cantons.

Background
The referendums on the constitutional amendments were mandatory referendums, which required a double majority; a majority of the popular vote and majority of the cantons. The decision of each canton was based on the vote in that canton. Full cantons counted as one vote, whilst half cantons counted as half. The railways referendum was an optional referendum, which required only a majority of the public vote.

Results

Railway nationalisation

Amendment to article 64 of the constitution

Addition of article 64bis to the constitution

References

1898 referendums
1898 in Switzerland
Referendums in Switzerland